Oskar Yngve Ludvig Lindqvist (1897-1937) was a sailor from Sweden, who represented his country at the 1928 Summer Olympics in Amsterdam, Netherlands.

Sources 
 

Sailors at the 1928 Summer Olympics – 6 Metre
Olympic sailors of Sweden
1897 births
1937 deaths
Swedish male sailors (sport)
Royal Gothenburg Yacht Club sailors
Sportspeople from Gothenburg